Pure Heavy is the fifth album by Norwegian rock band Audrey Horne, released in 2015. It continued the double lead guitar harmony sound that the band moved into with their previous effort, Youngblood.

Track listing
All tracks written by Audrey Horne.
"Wolf in My Heart" - 3:58
"Holy Roller" - 4:09
"Out of the City" - 3:32
"Volcano Girl" - 3:32
"Tales from the Crypt" - 3:19
"Diamond" - 1:30
"Into the Wild" - 3:40
"Gravity" - 4:25
"High & Dry" - 4:20
"Waiting for the Night" - 4:05
"Boy Wonder" - 5:50
Bonus tracks
"Let Live" - 4:12
"Between the Devil and the Deep Blue Sea" - 3:37

Personnel

Audrey Horne
Toschie - vocals
Ice Dale (Arve Isdal) - guitars
Thomas Tofthagen - guitars
Kjetil Greve - drums
Espen Lien - bass

Additional Personnel
Jørgen Træen - keyboards, additional guitars
Iver Sandøy - percussion, backing vocals, additional guitars

Production
Produced and engineered by Jørgen Træen and Iver Sandøy in Duper Studio and Solslottet Studio
Mixed by Jørgen Træen in Duper Studio
Mastered by Iver Sandøy, Solslottet Studio

Charts

References

2015 albums
Audrey Horne (band) albums
Napalm Records albums